José Landazábal Uriarte (7 January 1899 - 5 February 1970), nicknamed Lakatos, was a Spanish footballer who played as a forward. He earned his nickname Lakatos for his resemblance to the Hungarian international footballer Schlosser-Lakatos.

Club career
Born in Durango, Biscay, he began to play football in the youth ranks of local clubs such as Irala-Barri FC and Hispania, and with the latter he won the Children's championship at the age of 14, doing it so while playing "with espadrilles in every game". He then joined New Club, where he played a crucial role in helping them win the North second category in the 1916–17 season. At New Club, he stood out for his adapting and physical qualities, which eventually drew the attention of Athletic Club, who signed him in 1917 to replace the great Félix Zubizarreta. A year later, in 1918, he joined FC Barcelona, after a very brief unsuccessful experience with another Barcelona team, Canadienses FC, which he had joined on the advice of Paco Bru. He made his debut with Barça on 15 September 1918, in a tribute match to Pere Monistrol that ended in a 2-1 win over CE Sabadell FC. Lakatos formed a great attacking front with Vicente Martínez and Paulino Alcántara, which was pivotal in Barcelona's back-to-back Catalan championships and Copa del Rey finals between 1918 and 1920. Oddly, Barcelona won the 1920 final in which he did not play, but lost the 1919 final in which he played and scored in a 2-5 loss to Arenas de Getxo, courtesy of a hat-trick from Félix Sesúmaga, who then joined Barcelona, which prompted his dismissal from the club in 1920, leaving the club with 53 matches and 33 goals, thirty of them in his first season.

His next club was FC Martinenc of the Catalan second category, and played with them for 5 seasons (1920–23 and 1924–26), becoming the greatest figures of the club in the 1920s. He helped Martinenc achieve promotion to the main category at the end of the 1922-23 season, and he then helped the club win the championship for the winners of the second category after beating Esperanza de San Sebastián 4-2 in the final on 13 May 1923 at Atotxa, with Lakatos closing the scoring in the 85th minute. In August 1922 he played two friendlies with Athletic Club against Real Sociedad, in which he scored two goals, and on 27 May 1923 he reappeared with Barcelona, netting in a 5-0 win over Bishop Auckland at Les Corts, in the same match Hungarian goalkeeper Ferenc Plattkó made his debut for the Catalan club. He played a second match with Barça in June, but Lakatos would develop that campaign in the ranks of RCD Espanyol. Martinenc granted him a tribute match on 30 June 1926, in which they faced a Barcelona team that had the likes of Piera, Samitier and Alcántara, and shockingly, the local team thrashed the visitors 6-1, with 'Laka' scoring his last two goals as a Martinenc footballer.

He left Catalonia in 1927 to join Gimnástico de Valencia, before signing for Patria Aragón in Zaragoza, with whom he faced his former club Barcelona in the 1928 Copa del Rey; in a tie in which Lakatos scored his side's consolation goal. After a couple of short spells at Plentzia, Getxo and Hospitalenc SC, he hung up his boots in 1931. He was found dead of natural causes in the pension where he lived.

International career
He earned only one cap for the Catalonia national team, which was held on 24 February 1924 against Avenç del Sport as a tribute match to Gabriel Bau.

Honours

Club
Barcelona
Catalan football championship:
Champions (2): 1918-19 and 1919-20

Copa del Rey:
Champions (1): 1920
Runner-up (1): 1919

References

1899 births
1970 deaths
Sportspeople from Biscay
Footballers from Catalonia
Spanish footballers
Association football forwards
Athletic Bilbao footballers
FC Barcelona players
FC Martinenc players
RCD Espanyol footballers
Catalonia international footballers
People from Durangaldea
Footballers from the Basque Country (autonomous community)